百萬富翁 may refer to:
Hong Kong version of Who Wants to Be a Millionaire?
Malaysian Mandarin version of Who Wants to Be a Millionaire?